Neeman may refer to:

Cal Neeman (1929–2015), retired professional baseball player who played catcher in the Major Leagues from 1957 to 1963
Herzog, Fox & Ne'eman, the largest law firm in Israel
Itay Neeman (born 1972), Israeli-American mathematician
Neeman Committee, established to solve disputes concerning the process of Conversion to Judaism within the borders of Israel
Yaakov Neeman (1939–2017), Israeli lawyer and the current Minister of Justice
Yael Neeman (born 1960), Israeli author

See also
Ne'eman (disambiguation)
Neman (disambiguation)